This is a list of members of the Tasmanian House of Assembly, elected at the 2006 state election.

 Labor MHA for Franklin and outgoing Premier of Tasmania, Paul Lennon, resigned on 27 May 2008. Ross Butler was elected as his replacement on 10 June 2008.
 Tasmanian Greens MHA for Denison and party leader, Peg Putt, resigned on 7 July 2008. Cassy O'Connor was elected as her replacement on 21 July 2008. Putt was replaced as leader by Nick McKim.
 Labor MHA for Franklin, Paula Wriedt, resigned on 18 January 2009. Daniel Hulme was elected as her replacement on 2 February 2009.

Distribution of seats

See also
List of past members of the Tasmanian House of Assembly

Members of Tasmanian parliaments by term
21st-century Australian politicians